Dorothy Seacombe (22 March 1906 – December 1994) was a British film actress.

Filmography
 Blinkeyes (1926)
 The Flag Lieutenant (1926)
 The Third Eye (1929)
 The Loves of Robert Burns (1930)
 Lord Richard in the Pantry (1930)
 Leave It to Me (1930)
 The Yellow Mask (1930)
 The Ware Case (1938)
 Many Tanks Mr. Atkins (1938)

References

External links

1906 births
Year of death unknown
British film actresses
1994 deaths
20th-century British actresses